Forever After is a 2014 album by V. Rose.

Forever After may also refer to:
Forever After (film), a 1926 American silent drama film
Forever After, a novel by Catherine Anderson 1998

Music
Forever After, a 1995 album by Koxbox
Forever After, a 2010 album by Astral
"Forever After", a single by Paradise Lost from the 2005 album Paradise Lost
"Forever After", a 1987 single by Madonna Tassi
"Forever After", song by Savatage from the 1993 album Edge of Thorns
"Forever After", song by Delerium from the 2003 album Chimera
"Forever After", song by Angels of Venice from the 2001 album Music for Harp

See also
"Forever After All", a 2020 song by Luke Combs
Shrek Forever After, a 2010 American film